, nicknamed Hiro or Poyo,  is a Japanese professional basketball player who plays for the Iwate Big Bulls of the B.League in Japan.　He played college basketball for the Kanto Gakuin University.

Career statistics

Regular season 

|-
| align="left" | 2014-15
| align="left" | Aomori
| 19|| || 2.4||14.3 || 0|| 50.0||0.2 || 0.2|| 0.0|| 0.1||  0.4
|-
| align="left" | 2015-16
| align="left" | Aomori
| 15||  || 3.9|| 36.4|| 0|| 50.0|| 0.5|| 0.0||0.1|| 0.3||  0.7
|-
| align="left" | 2016-17
| align="left" | Aomori
| 34|| 8||5.7|| 25.0|| 0.0|| 41.7|| 0.5|| 0.1|| 0.1|| 0.1|| 0.6
|-
| align="left" | 2017-18
| align="left" | Aomori
||27 ||6 ||8.6 ||38.3 ||0 ||60.0||0.8 ||0.3||0.2||0.2 ||1.4
|-
| align="left" | 2018-19
| align="left" | Akita
||44  ||  || 4.4 || 28.0 || 0 ||50.0  || 0.7 || 0.2 || 0.0 || 0.0 ||0.3
|-
| align="left" | 2019-20
| align="left" | Iwate
||21 || 1 || 11.2 || 61.3|| 0 ||69.2  || 1.0 || 0.6 || 0.1 || 0.0 ||2.2
|}

Playoffs 

|-
|style="text-align:left;"|2015-16
|style="text-align:left;"|Aomori
| 1 ||   ||3.00  || .000   || .000 || .000 ||00 ||0.0 || 0.0|| 0 ||0.0
|-

Early cup games 

|-
|style="text-align:left;"|2017
|style="text-align:left;"|Aomori
| 1 || 0 || 13.00 || .800 || .000 || .000 || 2.0 || 0.0 || 0.0 || 0 || 8.0
|-
|style="text-align:left;"|2018
|style="text-align:left;"|Akita
|2 ||1 || 13.41 || .333 || .000 || .000 || 0.0 || 0.0 ||0.0 || 0 || 1.0
|-

Preseason games

|-
| align="left" |2018
| align="left" | Akita
| 2 || 0 || 7.9 || 1.000 ||.000  || 1.000||0.0 || 0.5|| 0.0 || 0.0 ||  3.0
|-

Source: Changwon1Changwon2

Trivia
His hobby is watching DVD videos.

References

1992 births
Living people
Akita Northern Happinets players
Aomori Wat's players
Iwate Big Bulls players
Japanese men's basketball players
Sportspeople from Aomori Prefecture
Power forwards (basketball)